Mount Bethel is an unincorporated community in Upper Mount Bethel Township in Northampton County, Pennsylvania. It is part of the Lehigh Valley metropolitan area, which had a population of 861,899 and was the 68th most populous metropolitan area in the U.S. as of the 2020 census.

Mount Bethel is located along Pennsylvania Route 611, north of the intersection with Pennsylvania Route 512.

References

Unincorporated communities in Northampton County, Pennsylvania
Unincorporated communities in Pennsylvania